Stephen Noteboom (born 31 July 1969) is a former professional tennis player from the Netherlands.  

Noteboom enjoyed most of his tennis success while playing doubles.  During his career he won 2 doubles titles.  He achieved a career-high doubles ranking of world no. 52 in 1997.

Career finals

Doubles (2 titles)

External links
 
 

1969 births
Living people
Dutch male tennis players
People from Geldrop
Sportspeople from North Brabant
20th-century Dutch people
21st-century Dutch people